The Papua New Guinea national under-19 cricket team represents the country of Papua New Guinea in Under-19 international cricket.

PNG has qualified for the Under-19 Cricket World Cup on eight occasions, the most of any associate team in the ICC East Asia-Pacific region. However, the team has only won three matches in World Cup history and has never made it past the first round.

History
Papua New Guinea finished third in the 2009 ICC Under-19 Cricket World Cup Qualifier which was held in Canada. The team gained victories over the Under-19 teams of Hong Kong, Canada, Uganda, Sierra Leone, Vanuatu, the United States and the Netherlands. The team lost only two matches to Ireland and Afghanistan. Papua New Guinea's performance in this tournament gained them qualification for the 2010 ICC Under-19 Cricket World Cup.

At the 2020 Under-19 Cricket World Cup qualification EAP event, Papua New Guinea were undefeated going into the final game against Japan (also undefeated). However, they forfeited the match after Cricket PNG suspended eleven members of the squad due to breaching the team's code of conduct. The Papua New Guinea Cricket Board later suspended ten of the players for a year, after bringing the game into disrepute following a shop-lifting incident.

Under-19 World Cup record

List of captains
Ten people have captained Papua New Guinea in under-19 One Day International (ODI) matches. Chris Amini, who captained the Papua New Guinea senior team in its inaugural ODI series in November 2014, is the only player to captain Papua New Guinea in both under-19 and regular ODIs.

Records
All records listed are for under-19 One Day International (ODI) matches only.

Team records

Highest totals
 239/5 (50 overs), v. , at Allan Border Field, Brisbane, 19 August 2012
 235 (50 overs), v. , at WEP Harris Oval, Brisbane, 21 August 2012
 222/6 (50 overs), v. , at Lincoln Green, Lincoln, 23 January 2002
 219 (44.2 overs), v. , at Sheikh Abu Naser Stadium, Khulna, 18 February 2004
 211 (46.4 overs), v. , at Colin Maiden Park, Auckland, 31 January 2002

Lowest totals
 50 (22.4 overs), v. , at Queen's Park Oval, Trinidad,  January 2022
 53 (17.5 overs), v. , at Bert Sutcliffe Oval, Lincoln, 20 January 2002
 56 (28.2 overs), v. , at Sharjah Cricket Stadium, Sharjah, 19 February 2014
 59 (26 overs), v. , at Manzil Park, Klerksdorp, 14 January 1998
 59 (24.5 overs),v. , at Bert Sutcliffe Oval, Lincoln, 19 January 2018

Individual records

Most career runs
 271 – Tony Ura (from 11 matches between 2008 and 2010, at an average of 27.10)
 208 – Sese Bau (from 12 matches between 2010 and 2012, at an average of 18.90)
 205 – Christopher Kent (from 6 matches in 2012, at an average of 41.00)
 176 – Frank Joseph (from 6 matches in 2002, at an average of 29.33)
 173 – Chris Amini (from 13 matches between 2008 and 2012, at an average of 13.30)

Highest individual scores
 105* (117 balls) – Christopher Kent, v. , at Allan Border Field, Brisbane, 19 August 2012
 92 (126 balls) – Frank Joseph, v. , at Lincoln Green, Lincoln, 23 January 2002
 84* (89 balls) – Assad Vala, v. , at Sheikh Abu Naser Stadium, Khulna, 18 February 2004
 81 (117 balls) – Simon Atai, v. , at Lincoln Green, Lincoln, 22 January 2018
 76* (55 balls) – Tony Ura, v. , at Johor Cricket Academy Oval, Johor, 25 February 2008

Most career wickets
 23 – Raymond Haoda (from 12 matches between 2010 and 2012, at an average of 19.52)
 13 – Alei Nao (from 8 matches between 2012 and 2014, at an average of 21.30)
 13 – Kabua Morea (from 9 matches between 2012 and 2014, at an average of 24.76)
 10 – James Tau (from 6 matches in 2018, at an average of 20.10)
 9 – John Reva (from 7 matches between 2008 and 2010, at an average of 21.88)

Best bowling performances
 5/16 (7.4 overs) – Toua Dai, v. , at St Stithians College, Johannesburg, 22 January 1998
 5/19 (9 overs) – John Kariko, v. , at Diego Martin Sporting Complex, Diego Martin, 28 January 2022
 5/32 (7.1 overs) – Chad Soper, v. , at Endeavour Park, Townsville, 16 August 2012
 5/34 (8.3 overs) – Raymond Haoda, v. , at Nelson Park, Napier, 24 January 2010
 5/45 (7 overs) – Christopher Kent, v. , at Endeavour Park, Townsville, 11 August 2012

References

Under-19 cricket teams
Papua New Guinea in international cricket